Chuwar may refer to:
Chuwar, Queensland, Australia
Chavar, Iran